{{Taxobox
| image = 
| regnum = Fungi
| divisio = Basidiomycota
| classis = Agaricomycetes
| ordo = Boletales
| familia = Boletaceae
| genus = Parvixerocomus
| species = P. pseudoaokii | binomial = Parvixerocomus pseudoaokii
| binomial_authority = (Hongo) G.Wu, N.K.Zeng & Zhu L.Yang (2015)
}}Parvixerocomus pseudoaokii is a species of bolete fungus in the family Boletaceae, and the type species of the genus Parvixerocomus. It was described by  Chinese mycologists Gang Wu and Zhu L. Yang in 2015. It is found only in southwestern, southeastern and southern China, where it grows in subtropical forests with trees of the family Fagaceae, and in mixed forests with Fagaceae and Chinese red pine (Pinus massoniana). All parts of the bolete stain blue when cut or injured.

References

External links

Boletaceae
Fungi described in 2015
Fungi of China